Cryptoclearance (April 9, 1984 in Kentucky – September 24, 2009) was an American Thoroughbred racehorse who won the Florida Derby in 1987 and the Hawthorne Gold Cup in 1988 and 1999.

Racing career
Trained by future Hall of Fame trainer Scotty Schulhofer, Cryptoclearance raced for three years, winning 12 of his 44 starts including four Grade 1 races.

In 1987, Cryptoclearance won the Florida Derby before coming fourth in the Kentucky Derby to Alysheba, third in the Preakness Stakes to Alysheba, and second in the Belmont Stakes to Bet Twice.

Retirement and Breeding Career
Retired to stud duty, Cryptoclearance stood at Margaux Farm in Midway, Kentucky.

His top offspring include:
 Victory Gallop, winner of the 1998 Belmont Stakes Classic and voted 1999 American Champion Older Male Horse. Retired from racing with career earnings of $3,505,895.
 Cryptocloser, 1997 Canadian Champion 3-Year-Old Male Horse
 Volponi, winner of the 2002 Breeders' Cup Classic. Retired with career earnings of $3,187,232.

Pedigree

External links
 Cryptoclearance's pedigree and partial racing stats

1984 racehorse births
2009 racehorse deaths
Racehorses bred in Kentucky
Racehorses trained in the United States
Thoroughbred family 4-m